Bakala is a genus of Australian intertidal spiders containing the single species, Bakala episinoides. It was  first described by V. T. Davies in 1990, and has only been found in Australia.

References

Desidae
Spiders described in 1990
Taxa named by Valerie Todd Davies